Heat is a 1972 American comedy drama film written and directed by Paul Morrissey, produced by Andy Warhol, and starring Joe Dallesandro, Sylvia Miles and Andrea Feldman. The film was conceived by Warhol as a parody of the 1950 film Sunset Boulevard. It is the final installment of the "Paul Morrissey Trilogy" produced by Warhol, following Flesh (1968) and Trash (1970).

Plot
Joey Davis is an unemployed former child star who supports himself as a hustler in Los Angeles. Joey uses sex to get his landlady to reduce his rent, then seduces Sally Todd, a former Hollywood starlet. Sally tries to help Joey revive his career but her status as a mediocre ex-actress proves to be quite useless. Sally's psychotic daughter, Jessica, further complicates the relationship between Sally and the cynical, emotionally numb Joey.

Cast
 Joe Dallesandro as Joey Davis
 Sylvia Miles as Sally Todd
 Andrea Feldman as Jessica
 Pat Ast as Lydia, the motel owner
 Ray Vestal as Ray, the producer
 Lester Persky as Sidney
 Eric Emerson as Eric
 Gary Kaznocha as Gary
 Harold Stevenson as Harold (credited as Harold Childe)
 John Hallowell as Gossip columnist
 Pat Parlemon as Girl by the pool
 Bonnie Walder as Bonnie

Release
The film was shown at the 1972 Cannes Film Festival. The film was also screened at the New York Film Festival on October 5, 1972, before opening the following day at New York's Festival Theatre and then expanding to the Waverly Theatre in Greenwich Village and the Rialto Theatre in Times Square on October 11.

Reception
The film was well received at Cannes and the New York Film Festival screening was standing-room only and was received by a generally enthusiastic crowd however three people walked out, with one lady claiming "It's the most disgusting thing I have ever seen" and referring to the films of the era "Make them, make them, just don't show them to anybody."

At a panel discussion following the New York Film Festival screening, Otto Preminger called it "depressingly entertaining". After previously ignoring most Warhol films, the New York Daily News reviewed the film, with Kathleen Carroll awarding it three stars. The advert for the film was censored in the Daily News with a t-shirt painted on Dallesandro and a bra strap on Miles.

Andrea Feldman, who had a much larger role than in previous Warhol films, died shortly before the film was released, jumping from the fourteenth floor of her parents' apartment. Her performance garnered positive reviews, with Judith Crist, writing in New York magazine, "The most striking performance, in large part non-performance, comes from the late Andrea Feldman, as the flat-voiced, freaked-out daughter, a mass of psychotic confusion, infantile and heart-breaking."

The film grossed $28,000 in its first week.

See also
 List of American films of 1972
Andy Warhol filmography

References

External links

1972 films
1972 comedy-drama films
American LGBT-related films
American comedy-drama films
Films directed by Paul Morrissey
Films about prostitution in the United States
Films scored by John Cale
1972 LGBT-related films
LGBT-related black comedy films
LGBT-related comedy-drama films
LGBT-related drama films
1970s English-language films
1970s American films